Now is a studio album by The Dubliners released in 1975. Following the departure of both Ciarán Bourke and Ronnie Drew in 1974, singer/guitarist Jim McCann joined Barney McKenna, Luke Kelly and John Sheahan as a member of The Dubliners to record this album, which Sheahan himself produced. The slight shift in personnel produced a more mellow sound. Arguably, McCann's greatest contribution to the album is the ballad "Carrickfergus", which became one of his most popular and requested songs. It also features a wonderful rendition of the English ballad, "The Unquiet Grave", performed by Luke Kelly.

Track listing

Side One: 
 "Farewell to Carlingford"
 "The Old Triangle"
 "The Beggarman"
 "Matt Hyland"
 "The Downfall of Paris"
 "Carrickfergus"

Side Two:
 "Lord of the Dance"
 "The Lifeboat Mona"
 "Farewell to Ireland"
 "The Unquiet Grave"
 "Lord Inchiquin"
 "The Lark in the Morning"

References

The Dubliners albums
1975 albums
Polydor Records albums